Louis Elwood Jenkins Jr., known as Woody Jenkins (born January 3, 1947), is a newspaper editor in Baton Rouge and Central City, Louisiana, who served as a member of the Louisiana House of Representatives from 1972 to 2000 and waged three unsuccessful races for the United States Senate in 1978, 1980, and 1996.

State constitutional convention
Jenkins was elected as a delegate to Louisiana's state constitutional convention, which met from late 1972 to early 1974. His colleagues included fellow Representative R. Harmon Drew Sr., future Governor Buddy Roemer and later Secretary of State and Insurance Commissioner James H. "Jim" Brown. He served on the convention's Committee on Bill of Rights and Elections, and he authored much of the new constitution's Declaration of Rights. The proposed constitution was approved by the delegates and ratified by the voters in a statewide election held in April 1974. Formally adopted in 1975, the document is still in effect.

Other political ventures
When Republicans failed to field candidates for the United States Senate in 1978 against the incumbent Democrat J. Bennett Johnston Jr., and again in 1980 against Russell B. Long, Jenkins opposed both incumbents, himself running as a Democrat.
In a campaign appearance in Minden in Webster Parish, Jenkins vowed to secure funds for the Louisiana Army Ammunition Plant, which has since closed, and Barksdale Air Force Base in Bossier City. He claimed that Johnston had voted "too closely" with proposals advanced by U.S. President Jimmy Carter. He questioned why Johnston had voted to divert intrastate natural gas from Louisiana industries to residential areas in such states as New York and Ohio.

In 1976, Jenkins and Dan Richey of Ferriday in Concordia Parish were the only House members to oppose the state appropriations bill, which passed 88-2. Richey stumped for Jenkins during his 1978 and 1980 U.S. Senate election runs, and Jenkins returned the favor by campaigning for Richey's election to the state Senate in 1979.

In 1981, Jenkins and later U.S. Representative Clyde C. Holloway of Rapides Parish, one of the four parishes that Jenkins had carried in his 1980 Senate race against Russell Long, spoke at a rally in Alexandria. There the two endorsed proposed constitutional amendments to halt forced busing for the purpose of desegregating public schools and to require the election, instead of presidential appointment and U.S. Senate confirmation, of U.S. judges. Jenkins told the rally:
What we need in America is a constitutional amendment against forced busing, and any American who says he is against busing and won't support a constitutional amendment is a liar.

U.S. House special election, 2008

On January 16, 2008, U.S. Representative Richard Hugh Baker, representing Louisiana's 6th congressional district, announced that he would soon resign from Congress. The political careers of Jenkins and Baker actually began on the same day thirty-four years earlier in 1972, when both were freshman Democratic members of the East Baton Rouge Parish state House delegation.

On January 17, 2008, Jenkins announced his candidacy for the GOP nomination in the special election. Jenkins received the endorsements of Pat Toomey's Club for Growth Political Action Committee, and Dr. James Dobson, founder of Focus on the Family. He also received the endorsement of the East Baton Rouge Parish Republican Party. Jenkins later received the endorsement of the National Rifle Association.

In the primary, he faced Paul Sawyer, Baker's congressional aide, Laurinda L. Calongne, president of Robert Rose Consulting; and Michael Cloonan, a veteran of the United States Navy from East Feliciana Parish.

Jenkins led in public opinion polls prior to the primary but fell eighty-four votes short of an outright majority to win the GOP nomination. Calongne, with 7,584 ballots (25 percent), finished second and forced Jenkins, with 14,849 votes (just under 50 percent), into a runoff. Sawyer trailed with 6,924 (23 percent). Cloonan held the critical balance of 425 votes (1 percent).

In the April 5 Republican runoff against Calongne, Jenkins won handily, taking 15,179 (62 percent) of the vote to Calongne's 9,327 (38 percent) votes. He faced Democratic State Representative Don Cazayoux of New Roads in the special election. Jenkins was immediately endorsed by Governor Jindal.

In Congress, Senator David Vitter and the three Republicans in Louisiana's House delegation – Jim McCrery, Rodney Alexander, and Charles Boustany endorsed Jenkins. Jenkins was also supported by House Minority Leader John Boehner, Minority Whip Roy Blunt, and Assistant Whip Eric Cantor. On April 25, former U.S. Senator John Breaux, now a resident of Maryland, endorsed Cazayoux on grounds that the self-styled "John Breaux Democrat" could work across party lines. In 1996, Breaux had also opposed Jenkins in the race against Mary Landrieu.

Before the 1996 Senate general election, Jenkins' campaign retained a firm to do automated phone calls to voters. The firm had previously done work for David Duke, a white supremacist and fellow republican candidate in the primary for the 1996 senate election. He was fined $3,000 by the Federal Election Commission because the purchase was paid for by his ad agency instead of directly by the campaign. Later Jenkins learned that Duke received a commission from the firm he had hired, but Jenkins insisted that he had no knowledge that Duke would profit from the transaction. However, his signed agreement with the FEC admitted that he knew Duke had used the same firm.

Later developments

Election Denialism 
In the Fall of 2020 and Winter of 2020/2021, Jenkins published a series of articles supportive of the stolen-election claims being made by former President Donald Trump and his supporters.

Electoral history

1996 US Senate election in Louisiana

Louisiana's 6th congressional district special election, 2008

See also

 List of American politicians who switched parties in office
 Louisiana's 6th congressional district special election, 2008

References

External links
 The National Policy Council Biography
 
 Woody Jenkins Louisiana 6th Congressional District  Official Website
 Central City News
 Zachary Post
 South Baton Rouge Journal
 The Big Sleazy: Politics in New Orleans, Louisiana.
 Woody Jenkins' second chance

1947 births
Living people
Louisiana Republicans
Louisiana Democrats
Members of the Louisiana House of Representatives
Louisiana lawyers
Journalists from Louisiana
Businesspeople from Louisiana
American newspaper publishers (people)
American male journalists
Louisiana State University alumni
Louisiana State University Law Center alumni
People from Pointe Coupee Parish, Louisiana
Politicians from Baton Rouge, Louisiana
People from Central, Louisiana
Istrouma High School alumni
2020 United States presidential electors